Pyrausta despicata, the straw-barred pearl, is a species of moth of the family Crambidae. It was described by Giovanni Antonio Scopoli in his 1763 Entomologia Carniolica.

Description
The wingspan of Pyrausta despicata can reach 14–19 mm. The wings are brown or greyish, with quite variable pale brown markings. The forewings are  brownish grey
or brown, sometimes blackish-sprinkled; first line obscurely pale or obsolete; second in pale greyish-ochreous, often obsolete except on costa, in male whitish-ochreous, dilated on
costa; small orbicular and oval discal spot rather darker, in female sometimes separated by a pale spot; sometimes a pale subterminal streak. Hindwings in male grey in female blackish; sometimes a darker discal dot; a curved postmedian fascia and subterminal streak in male obscurely ochreous-whitish, in female whitish-ochreous. The larva is dull brownish-black; dorsal line double, grey; spiracular dull ochreous; spots black, grey circled; head and plate of 2 brown, darker-freckled 

The moth flies from May to September depending on the location, in two generations. It is active in the sunshine and at dusk. The larvae feed on Plantago lanceolata and Plantago major.

Distribution
Pyrausta despicata is present in most of Europe.

Habitat
This moth prefers chalky and limestone habitats.

References

External links
 Lepiforum.de
 

despicata
Moths described in 1763
Moths of Europe
Taxa named by Giovanni Antonio Scopoli